Slant 6 Mind is the title of the fourteenth principal album release by American folk singer/guitarist Greg Brown, released in 1997.

At the Grammy Awards of 1998, Slant 6 Mind was nominated for the Grammy Award for Best Traditional Folk Album.

Reception

Writing for Allmusic, music critic Jeff Burger wrote of the album "For the most part, this 14th album is business as usual for Greg Brown, which is very good news indeed... Suffice it to say that once you've heard Brown's voice, you won't forget it. And while Brown once claimed he could sing Hank Williams songs with even more passion than he delivers his own, this terrific album makes a more passionate performance hard to imagine."

Track listing
All songs by Greg Brown.
 "Whatever It Was" – 4:49
 "Loneliness House" – 4:24
 "Mose Allison Played Here" – 3:45
 "Spring & All" – 3:15
 "Vivid" – 3:15
 "Dusty Woods" – 5:57
 "Billy From the Hills" – 5:00
 "Speaking in Tongues" – 4:33
 "Enough" – 4:38
 "Hurt So Nice" – 2:13
 "Wild Like a Sonny Boy" – 3:41
 "Down at the Mill" – 4:08
 "Why Don't You Just Go Home" –4:23

Personnel
Greg Brown – vocals, guitar
Bo Ramsey – guitar, slide guitar, harmony vocals
Bob Black – banjo
Paul Griffith – drums
Dave Moore – harmonica
Al Murphy – fiddle
Kelly Joe Phelps – guitar, vocals, harmony vocals, lap steel guitar
Gordon Johnson – bass

Production
Produced by Bo Ramsey and Greg Brown
Engineered and mixed by Tom Tucker
Mastered by Bernie Grundman
Photography by Jim Herrington

References

Greg Brown (folk musician) albums
1997 albums
Red House Records albums